Named after the 19th century British mathematician Arthur Cayley, a Cayley table describes the structure of a finite group by arranging all the possible products of all the group's elements in a square table reminiscent of an addition or multiplication table.  Many properties of a groupsuch as whether or not it is abelian, which elements are inverses of which elements, and the size and contents of the group's centercan be discovered from its Cayley table.

A simple example of a Cayley table is the one for the group {1, −1} under ordinary multiplication:

History 
Cayley tables were first presented in Cayley's 1854 paper, "On The Theory of Groups, as depending on the symbolic equation θ n = 1".  In that paper they were referred to simply as tables, and were merely illustrativethey came to be known as Cayley tables later on, in honour of their creator.

Structure and layout
Because many Cayley tables describe groups that are not abelian, the product ab with respect to the group's binary operation is not guaranteed to be equal to the product ba for all a and b in the group.  In order to avoid confusion, the convention is that the factor that labels the row (termed nearer factor by Cayley) comes first, and that the factor that labels the column (or further factor) is second. For example, the intersection of row a and column b is ab and not ba, as in the following example:

Properties and uses

Commutativity 
The Cayley table tells us whether a group is abelian.  Because the group operation of an abelian group is commutative, a group is abelian if and only if its Cayley table's values are symmetric along its diagonal axis.  The group {1, −1} above and the cyclic group of order 3 under ordinary multiplication are both examples of abelian groups, and inspection of the symmetry of their Cayley tables verifies this.  In contrast, the smallest non-abelian group, the dihedral group of order 6, does not have a symmetric Cayley table.

Associativity 
Because associativity is taken as an axiom when dealing with groups, it is often taken for granted when dealing with Cayley tables.  However, Cayley tables can also be used to characterize the operation of a quasigroup, which does not assume associativity as an axiom (indeed, Cayley tables can be used to characterize the operation of any finite magma).  Unfortunately, it is not generally possible to determine whether or not an operation is associative simply by glancing at its Cayley table, as it is with commutativity. This is because associativity depends on a 3 term equation, while the Cayley table shows 2-term products. However, Light's associativity test can determine associativity with less effort than brute force.

Permutations 
Because the cancellation property holds for groups (and indeed even quasigroups), no row or column of a Cayley table may contain the same element twice.  Thus each row and column of the table is a permutation of all the elements in the group.  This greatly restricts which Cayley tables could conceivably define a valid group operation.

To see why a row or column cannot contain the same element more than once, let a, x, and y all be elements of a group, with x and y distinct.  Then in the row representing the element a, the column corresponding to x contains the product ax, and similarly the column corresponding to y contains the product ay.  If these two products were equalthat is to say, row a contained the same element twice, our hypothesisthen ax would equal ay.  But because the cancellation law holds, we can conclude that if ax = ay, then x = y, a contradiction.  Therefore, our hypothesis is incorrect, and a row cannot contain the same element twice.  Exactly the same argument suffices to prove the column case, and so we conclude that each row and column contains no element more than once.  Because the group is finite, the pigeonhole principle guarantees that each element of the group will be represented in each row and in each column exactly once.

Thus, the Cayley table of a group is an example of a latin square.

Another, maybe simpler proof: the cancellation property implies that for each x in the group, the one variable function of y f(x,y)= xy must be a one to one map. And one to one maps on finite sets are permutations.

Constructing Cayley tables 

Because of the structure of groups, one can very often "fill in" Cayley tables that have missing elements, even without having a full characterization of the group operation in question.  For example, because each row and column must contain every element in the group, if all elements are accounted for save one, and there is one blank spot, without knowing anything else about the group it is possible to conclude that the element unaccounted for must occupy the remaining blank space.  It turns out that this and other observations about groups in general allow us to construct the Cayley tables of groups knowing very little about the group in question. It should be noted, however, that a Cayley table constructed using the method that follows may fail to meet the associativity requirement of a group, and therefore represent a quasigroup.

The "identity skeleton" of a finite group 
Inverses are identified by identity elements in the table.  Because in any group, even a non-abelian group, every element commutes with its own inverse, it follows that the distribution of identity elements on the Cayley table will be symmetric across the table's diagonal.  Those that lie on the diagonal are their own unique inverse.

Because the order of the rows and columns of a Cayley table is in fact arbitrary, it is convenient to order them in the following manner: beginning with the group's identity element, which is always its own inverse, list first all the elements that are their own inverse, followed by pairs of inverses listed adjacent to each other.

Then, for a finite group of a particular order, it is easy to characterize its "identity skeleton", so named because the identity elements on the Cayley table constructed in the manner described in the previous paragraph are clustered about the main diagonaleither they lie directly on it, or they are one removed from it.

It is relatively trivial to prove that groups with different identity skeletons cannot be isomorphic, though the converse is not true (for instance, the cyclic group C8 and the quaternion group Q are non-isomorphic but have the same identity skeleton).

Consider a six-element group with elements e, a, b, c, d, and f.  By convention, e is the group's identity element.  Because the identity element is always its own inverse, and inverses are unique, the fact that there are 6 elements in this group means that at least one element other than e must be its own inverse.  So we have the following possible skeletons: 
all elements are their own inverses,
all elements save d and f are their own inverses, each of these latter two being the other's inverse,
a is its own inverse, b and c are inverses, and d and f are inverses.

In our particular example, there does not exist a group of the first skeleton of order 6; indeed, simply because a particular identity skeleton is conceivable does not in general mean that there exists a group that fits it.

Any group in which every element is its own inverse is abelian: let a and b be elements of the group, then ab = (ab)−1 = b−1a−1 = ba.

Filling in the identity skeleton
Once a particular identity skeleton has been decided on, it is possible to begin filling out the Cayley table.  For example, take the identity skeleton of a group of order 6 of the second skeleton outlined above:

Obviously, the e-row and the e-column can be filled out immediately.  

Once this is done there are several possible options on how to proceed. We will focus on the value of ab. By the Latin square property, the only possibly valid values of ab are c, d, or f. However we can see that swapping around the two elements d and f would result in exactly the same table as we already have, save for arbitrarily selected labels. We would therefore expect both of these two options to result in the same outcome, up to isomorphism, and so we need only consider one of them.

It is also important to note that one or several of the values may (and do, in our case) later lead to contradictionmeaning simply that they were in fact not valid values at all.

ab = c
By alternatingly multiplying on the left and on the right it is possible to extend one equation into a loop of equations where any one implies all the others:
Multiplying ab = c on the left by a gives b = ac
Multiplying b = ac on the right by c gives bc = a
Multiplying bc = a on the left by b gives c = ba
Multiplying c = ba on the right by a gives ca = b
Multiplying ca = b on the left by c gives a = cb
Multiplying a = cb on the right by b gives ab = c

Filling in all of these products, the Cayley table now looks like this (new elements in red):

Since the Cayley table is a Latin square, the only possibly valid value of ad is f, and similarly the only possible value of af is d. 

Filling in these values, the Cayley table now looks like this (new elements in blue):

Unfortunately, all elements of the group are already present either above or to the left of bd in the table so there is no value of bd that satisfies the Latin square property.

This means that the option we selected will be (ab = c) has led us to a point where no value can be assigned to bd without causing contradictions. We have therefore shown that ab ≠ c.

If we in a similar way show that all options lead to contradictions, then we must conclude that no group of order 6 exists with the identity skeleton that we started with.

ab = d
By alternatingly multiplying on the left and on the right it is possible to extend one equation into a loop of equations where any one implies all the others:
Multiplying ab = d on the left by a gives b = ad
Multiplying b = ad on the right by f gives bf = a
Multiplying bf = a on the left by b gives f = ba
Multiplying f = ba on the right by a gives fa = b
Multiplying fa = b on the left by d gives a = db
Multiplying a = db on the right by b gives ab = d

Filling in all of these products, the Cayley table now looks like this (new elements in red):

The remaining products of a, shown in blue, may now be entered using the Latin square property. For example, c is missing from row a and cannot occur twice in column c, hence ac = f.

Similarly, the remaining products of b, shown in green, may then be entered:

The remaining products, each of which is the only missing value in either a row or a column, may now be filled in using the Latin square property, shown in orange:

As we have managed to fill in the whole table without obtaining a contradiction, we have found a group of order 6, and inspection reveals it to be non-abelian.  This group is in fact the smallest non-abelian group, the dihedral group D3

Example of a quasigroup constructed using the above method 
The Cayley table that follows may be constructed by entering an identity skeleton, filling in the first row and column, and then postulating that ab = c. The alternative assumption ab = d results in a homomorphism. The rest of the table follows as a Latin square. However, by reference to the table (ac)b = db = a, while a(cb) = ad = b. It therefore fails the associativity axiom and represents a quasigroup rather than a group.

Permutation matrix generation 

The standard form of a Cayley table has the order of the elements in the rows the same as the order in the columns. Another form is to arrange the elements of the columns so that the nth column corresponds to the inverse of the element in the nth row.  In our example of D3, we need only switch the last two columns, since f and d are the only elements that are not their own inverses, but instead inverses of each other.

This particular example lets us create six permutation matrices (all elements 1 or 0, exactly one 1 in each row and column).  The 6x6 matrix representing an element will have a 1 in every position that has the letter of the element in the Cayley table and a zero in every other position, the Kronecker delta function for that symbol.  (Note that e is in every position down the main diagonal, which gives us the identity matrix for 6x6 matrices in this case, as we would expect.)  Here is the matrix that represents our element a, for example.

This shows us directly that any group of order n is a subgroup of the permutation group Sn, order n!.

Generalizations 
The above properties depend on some axioms valid for groups.  It is natural to consider Cayley tables for other algebraic structures, such as for semigroups, quasigroups, and magmas, but some of the properties above do not hold.

See also 
 Latin square

 Sudoku

References 
 Cayley, Arthur. "On the theory of groups, as depending on the symbolic equation θ n = 1", Philosophical Magazine, Vol. 7 (1854), pp. 40–47.  Available on-line at Google Books as part of his collected works.
 Cayley, Arthur. "On the Theory of Groups", American Journal of Mathematics, Vol. 11, No. 2 (Jan 1889), pp. 139–157. Available at JSTOR.

Finite groups